Coastal Railways with Julie Walters is a British television programme on Channel 4 presented by actress Julie Walters that first aired on 26 November 2017. A re-edited version combining the first two episodes and entitled Scotland's Coastal Railways with Julie Walters was broadcast on 10 January 2021.

History
Julie Walters introduces the programmes telling of her own love of the coast. Each episode features Walters travelling for five days on a coastal railway in Britain, experiencing the landscapes and its people.

The series' first distribution in the United States took place in July 2018, on the video streaming service Acorn TV, and in 2019 it aired on Public Broadcasting Service (PBS) network stations.

List of episodes

References

External links

2017 British television series debuts
2017 British television series endings
2010s British documentary television series
Documentary television series about railway transport
Channel 4 documentaries
British travel television series
Rail transport in Great Britain
English-language television shows